Live at the House of Blues is a live album from the band Thrice released by Vagrant Records on December 9, 2008. The album spans two CDs and includes a DVD featuring live footage and an exclusive interview in which the band answers fan-submitted questions.  The track listing consists of songs from 2002's The Illusion of Safety through 2008's The Alchemy Index Vols. III & IV. The live footage was filmed at the House of Blues in Anaheim, California.

Track listing
The DVD listing is the same as the CDs.

Personnel
Dustin Kensrue – lead vocals, electric and acoustic guitar, synthesizer ("Digital Sea"), maracas ("The Earth Isn't Humming")
Teppei Teranishi – electric guitar, keyboards, backing vocals, glockenspiel ("Broken Lungs")
Ed Breckenridge – bass, keyboards, backing vocals, electric guitar ("Open Water" and "The Earth Isn't Humming")
Riley Breckenridge – drums, sampling

References

Thrice albums
2008 live albums
Vagrant Records live albums
2008 video albums
Live video albums
Vagrant Records video albums
Albums recorded at the House of Blues